Oxley, an electoral district of the Legislative Assembly in the Australian state of New South Wales, has had two incarnations, the first from 1920, returning 3 members until 1927 and was abolished in 1988. The second from 1991 until the present.


Members

Election results

Elections in the 2010s

2019

2015

2011

Elections in the 2000s

2007

2003

Elections in the 1990s

1999

1995

1991

1988 - 1991

Elections in the 1980s

1984

1981

1981 by-election

Elections in the 1970s

1978

1976

1973

1971

Elections in the 1960s

1968

1965 by-election

1965

1962

Elections in the 1950s

1959

1956

1953

1950

Elections in the 1940s

1947

1944

1941

Elections in the 1930s

1938

1935

1932

1930

Elections in the 1920s

1927

1925

1922

1920 appointment
George Briner died on 9 September 1920. Between 1920 and 1927 the Legislative Assembly was elected using a form of proportional representation with multi-member seats and a single transferable vote (modified Hare-Clark). There was confusion at the time as to the process to be used to fill the vacancy. When George Beeby resigned on 9 August 1920, in accordance with the practice prior to 1920, the Speaker of the Legislative Assembly issued a writ of election requiring a by-election to be conducted, however the Chief Electoral Officer said he couldn't do so under then law at the time and that a by-election would be contrary to the principle of proportional representation. The vacancies were left unfilled until the Parliament passed the Parliamentary Elections (Casual Vacancies) Act on 10 December 1920, so that casual vacancies were filled by the next unsuccessful candidate on the incumbent member's party list. Theodore Hill was the unsuccessful  candidate at the 1920 election and took his seat on 15 December 1920.

1920

References

New South Wales state electoral results by district